The list of Airfields of the United States Army Air Forces Fourth Air Force is as follows:

Tactical Airfields
 Bellingham International Airport
 Blythe Airport
 Charles M. Schulz–Sonoma County Airport
 Desert Center Airport
 Hamilton Army Airfield
 Jacqueline Cochran Regional Airport
 McChord Field
 Muroc Army Air Base
 Paso Robles Municipal Airport
 Portland Army Air Base
 Rice Army Airfield
 Visalia Municipal Airport

Group Training Stations
 Desert Center Airport
 Ephrata Municipal Airport
 Hamilton Army Airfield
 Jacqueline Cochran Regional Airport
 March Field
 McChord Field
 Muroc Army Air Base
 Oroville Municipal Airport
 Paso Robles Municipal Airport
 Portland Army Air Base
 Rice Army Airfield
 Tonopah Army Air Field
 Visalia Municipal Airport

Replacement Training Stations
 Barstow-Daggett Airport
 Buchanan Field Airport
 Catalina Airport
 Charles M. Schulz–Sonoma County Airport
 Chiriaco Summit Airport
 Coalinga Municipal Airport (Old)
 Corcoran Airport
 Delano Municipal Airport
 Eastern Sierra Regional Airport
 Fresno Chandler Executive Airport
 Grand Central Airport (California)
 Haigh Field Airport
 Half Moon Bay Airport
 Hamilton Army Airfield
 Hayward Executive Airport
 Naval Air Station Lemoore
 March Field
 Meadows Field Airport
 Montague Airport (California)
 Napa County Airport
 Needles Airport
 Olympia Regional Airport
 Palmdale Army Airfield
 Paso Robles Municipal Airport
 Porterville Municipal Airport
 Portland Army Air Base
 Redding Municipal Airport
 Sacramento Executive Airport
 Salinas Municipal Airport
 Siskiyou County Airport
 Tonopah Army Air Field
 United States Air Force Plant 42
 Van Nuys Air National Guard Base
 Visalia Municipal Airport
 Willows-Glenn County Airport
 Yuba County Airport

Sources
 R. Frank Futrell, “The Development of Base Facilities,” in The Army Air Forces in World War II, vol. 6, Men and Planes, ed. Wesley Frank Craven and James Lea Cate, 142 (Washington, D.C., Office of Air Force History, new imprint, 1983).

Airfields of the United States Army Air Forces in the United States
Lists of United States military installations
United States Army Air Forces lists
Lists of airports in the United States